The Castlebourne folly in the parish of Belbroughton, Worcestershire, England, was built as a sham castle towards the end of the eighteenth century and is similar in age and design to Clent Castle another folly about  away in an adjacent parish of Clent. The folly, wall and house are designated as a Grade II listed building by English Heritage.

The folly, and the later house, were built on a mound. The folly has a square three-bay plan. The two outer bays are formed by large circular two story corner towers. On the south side, the two towers have pointed windows (some blind), while on the first floor they have quatrefoil windows and relief mouldings above in form of Maltese crosses. The central bay has a blocked pointed doorway with hood mould
and returns. The floor above the doorway has a blind pointed first floor window. The roof is of slate behind embattled parapets. The wall connecting the folly to the house faces south-west and has an embattled parapet above a moulded cornice.

Notes

References

Folly castles in England
Grade II listed buildings in Worcestershire
Castles in Worcestershire
Grade II listed castles